Richard Courtenay was a prelate.

Richard Courtenay may also refer to:

Richard Courtenay (MP) (died 1696)

See also
Richard Courtney (disambiguation)